Mabie is an unincorporated community in Randolph County, West Virginia, United States. Mabie has a post office with ZIP code 26278. The town was originally named Roaring Creek after the stream that passes through the community, but the name was later changed to Mabie after W. H. Mabie built a sawmill there in 1897.

History

The first settlers arrived in the area beginning 1786 for the purpose of clearing the land for farming.  Later, newcomers were drawn to the area by its vast timber and mineral resources.  At one time, old growth forests with trees up to six or seven feet in diameter surrounded the community, and a seam of coal twelve feet thick was discovered in 1876.  The original Staunton and Parkersburg Turnpike bisects the community before it crosses Rich Mountain.
The Battle of Rich Mountain was fought nearby on July 11, 1861.

References

Unincorporated communities in Randolph County, West Virginia
Unincorporated communities in West Virginia
Coal towns in West Virginia